The Bank of Mauritius Tower (also known as Bank of Mauritius Building or Bank of Mauritius Headquarters) is a skyscraper in Port Louis, the capital of Mauritius, and a home to Bank of Mauritius. It is the tallest building of the country. When measured to roof, it stands at 98 m (321 ft)  and to pinnacle at 124 m (407 ft). The 16,834 m² reinforced concrete structure reached its final height in May 2006. The 22-storey building towers over the Citadel (a hill-top fortification in Port Louis) and is constructed in an area where highrises were once prohibited. It is also the second tallest structure in Mauritius after the much taller 183 m (600 ft) Bigara Station Transmitter (guyed mast) in the upper Plaines Wilhems.

Its construction took nearly 30 months and is resistant to seasonal hurricanes. Owing to its function, it is among the most technically advanced building in Mauritius.

Other tall buildings in Mauritius are the Telecom Tower with its twin lightning rods pointing at 101 m, the 82 m State Bank Tower and the Air Mauritius Centre with a helipad at 79 m. Outside Port Louis, the Ebene Cyber Tower is 72 m tall. Malherbes Station Transmitter (guyed mast) in Curepipe is 97 m tall.

Gallery

Notes and references

 
 Le Mauricien (21 January 2006)

External links
Bank of Mauritius

Office buildings completed in 2006
Bank buildings in Mauritius
Skyscraper office buildings in Mauritius
Buildings and structures in Port Louis